.vi is the Internet country code top-level domain (ccTLD) for the U.S. Virgin Islands.

Registration 
Registration is available in .vi or one of its second-level TLDs. Current prices are $75 for registration for residents of the U.S. Virgin Islands and $300 for foreign registrants. The second-level TLDs cost $75 or $200 respectively. There are premium domain names with different prices. Renewal fees are significantly lower and there is also a price for most contact or nameserver updates.

The only restriction for registration is that the domain has at least 2 active nameservers.

Third level registrations are available in .co.vi, .org.vi, .com.vi and .net.vi. There are no further restrictions in these zones.

Registrars 
Domains can be bought directly from the registry or from official registrars. The registry does not publish a list of official registrars.

A domain transfer between registrars is possible via Auth-Code.

History 
Second level domains (of more than 2 characters) were only allowed for Virgin Island companies or residents until 2014, when COBEX allowed foreign entities to register .vi domains.

See also 
 Internet in the United States Virgin Islands
 Internet in the United States
 .vg – ccTLD for neighboring British Virgin Islands
 .us – ccTLD for the United States

References

External links 
 IANA .vi whois information
 Official .vi domain registration website

Country code top-level domains
Communications in the United States Virgin Islands

sv:Toppdomän#V